Nursery Crimes were a hardcore band from Melbourne. They formed in early 1989 by Phil Rose on lead vocals. They played both locally and around Australia before disbanding in 1994. They released two full length albums, some singles and extended plays. Their debut releases were "All Torn up Inside" (1989 single), No Time for That Crime (1990 extended play, on pink bubblegum vinyl) and Fun Hurts! (May 1992, studio album). They were early pioneers and supporters of "all-ages", no-alcohol gigs, to allow a wider and younger audience to experience live music. Nursery Crimes were a support act on Australian tours by L7, Henry Rollins, Faith No More, Fugazi and All. Australian musicologist, Ian McFarlane, described how Nursery Crimes' "sound was built around melodic yet crunching guitar riffs, frenetic arrangements, rapid fire lead vocals and sweet harmonies". The group reunited for a series of gigs in 2006.

History
Nursery Crimes formed in Melbourne in early 1989 by Paddy Chong on bass guitar; Dave Dixon on guitar and backing vocals; Caine Knight on lead guitar; Russell Hopkinson on drums (ex-Vicious Circle, Bamboos, Kryptonics, Cremator); and Phil Rose (aka Richard Andrew Rose) on lead vocals (ex-Slush Puppies). Australian musicologist, Ian McFarlane, described how their "sound was built around melodic yet crunching guitar riffs, frenetic arrangements, rapid fire lead vocals and sweet harmonies".

Their debut single, "All Torn up Inside", was issued on Au Go Go Records late in the following year, together with their extended play, No Time for That Crime. Chong left the group to join Girl Monstar and then The Fuck Fucks, he was replaced on bass guitar by Davarj Thomas, who also provided backing vocals.

Nursery Crimes left Au Go Go and joined Survival Records, and in 1990 they released another EP, Marked by Time, which was produced by  Kaj Dahlstrom. For the European market, the group provided a compilation album, What Do You Know (Anyway)? on Normal Records. In April 1991 they issued their second single, "Eleanor Rigby", a cover version of The Beatles' 1966 song. Knight was replaced on lead guitar by James Masson, who added piano.

The group's debut studio album, Fun Hurts!, appeared in May 1992. It was co-produced by the band and Dahlstrom. McFarlane described it as "amphetamine-charged". By the end of that year Masson was replaced on guitar by James McInnes, and Chris Latham replaced Hopkinson on drums who joined You Am I.

In August 1993 the group released another EP, Something's Wrong with Our Heroes, and undertook a national tour to support it. Early the following year Nursery Crimes disbanded. During their career Nursery Crimes were a support act on Australian tours by L7, Henry Rollins, Faith No More, Fugazi and All. Thomas later joined pre.shrunk (1996–2003). In 1994 McInnes and Rose formed Shreen, McFarlane compared the two groups "Like Nursery Crimes, Shreen's sound combined melodic pop hooks, incisive guitar riffs, tight harmonies and rapid tempos". Dixon later joined the same group, which disbanded in 1996.

Rose has co-written material for Bodyjar, a Melbourne-based punk rock group. In mid-2006 Nursery Crimes reunited for a series of gigs in October and November with the line up of Dixon, Rose, Thomas, and McIness, joined by Ross Hetherington on drums (ex-Bodyjar).

In 2017, the band reunited again to open for Descendents; with Frenzal Rhomb drummer Gordy Forman filling in on drums.

Members
 Paddy Chong – bass guitar (1989–1990)
 Dave Dixon – guitar, vocals (1989–1994, 2006–2007, 2017)
 Russell Hopkinson – drums, percussion (1989–1992)
 Caine Knight – guitar (1989–1991)
 Phil Rose – vocals (1989–1994, 2006–2007, 2017)
 Davarj Thomas – bass guitar (1991–1994, 2006–2007, 2017)
 James Masson – guitar, piano (1991–1992)
 James McIness – guitar (1992–1994, 2006–2007, 2017)
 Chris Latham – drums (1992–1994)
 Ross Hetherington – drums (2006–2007)
 Gordy Forman - drums (2017)

Discography

Albums
 What Do You Know (Anyway)? (compilation album, 1990) – Rattlesnake Records, Shock Records/Normal Records (RAT 510)
 Fun Hurts! (1992) – Survival Records (SUR518 CD/469146.2)

Extended plays
 No Time for That Crime (1990) – Au Go Go Records (ANDA 117)
 Marked by Time (1990) – Au Go Go Records, Survival Records (SUR702CD)
 Something's Wrong with Our Heroes (August 1993) – MDS (ABC123)

Singles
 "All Torn Up Inside" – (1989)
 "Eleanor Rigby" – (1991)

References

General
  Note: Archived [on-line] copy has limited functionality.
Specific

External links
Beat Magazine Live Review

Australian rock music groups
Musical groups established in 1989
Musical groups disestablished in 1994
Victoria (Australia) musical groups
Au Go Go Records artists